Henley Hollow is a valley in Warren County in the U.S. state of Missouri. The intermittent stream in Henley Hollow is a tributary to Little Lost Creek in the Little Lost Creek State Forest.

Henley Hollow most likely bears the name of a pioneer citizen.

References

Valleys of Warren County, Missouri
Valleys of Missouri